Robert Mathew Aldighieri (born March 20, 1965) is an American freestyle skier. He competed in the men's moguls event at the 1992 Winter Olympics. He attended Castleton State College.

References

External links
 

1965 births
Living people
American male freestyle skiers
Olympic freestyle skiers of the United States
Freestyle skiers at the 1992 Winter Olympics
People from Teaneck, New Jersey
Sportspeople from Bergen County, New Jersey